"Nowhere" is a song by Northern Irish rock band Therapy?, released as a single on 17 January 1994 through A&M Records. A remix CD was released a week later on 24 January 1994. The song is featured on the Troublegum album. The single reached number 18 on the UK Singles Chart, number six on the Irish Singles Chart, and number seven on the Finnish Singles Chart. The single was released on CD, CD digipak, CD remix, 7-inch vinyl and cassette.

Track listings

CD remix

European CD

Personnel
 Andy Cairns: vocals/guitar
 Fyfe Ewing: drums
 Michael McKeegan: bass
 Chris Sheldon: engineer, producer, mixer
 Mudd Wallace and Therapy?: producer (CC Rider)
 Andrew Weatherall: additional production and remix
 Gary Burns: additional production and remix
 Jagz Kooner: additional production and remix
 Valerie Phillips: photography
 Jeremy Pearce: design
 Simon Carrington: design

Charts

References

1994 singles
1994 songs
A&M Records singles
British pop punk songs
Song recordings produced by Chris Sheldon
Songs written by Andy Cairns
Therapy? songs